Florist Shop is a puzzle game developed by Teyon for the Nintendo DS. The game is published by UFO Interactive Games in the North America and by Rondomedia in Germany, Switzerland and Austria.

Gameplay

Florist Shop is a combination of the match-3 and the time management genres. As in classical match-3 games, a player’s task is to switch neighbouring elements (here: flowers) to match a line of the same type. A player has to connect at least 3 identical flowers vertically or horizontally to make them disappear from a board. Gathered flowers are used to create 10 various bouquets ordered by shop’s clients. The time management part of the game consists of creation of all bouquets in the specified time. A player can freely choose which one to prepare first. As time goes by, flowers wilt on a board and clients get impatient, so a final price of a bouquet falls down. A player can use special items to prevent such situations. In each level a player has to collect a specified amount of money to advance to the next stage. Plenty of add-ons and special items help to achieve a better score and make the game more challenging. Virtual money earned in the game can be used to buy add-ons, various bouquets and special items.

Bouquets
The most important feature for bouquets is freshness. Bouquets of the highest price are made of fresh flowers which have just appeared on a board. When flowers start to wilt, a player can use a watering-can or a sprinkler to improve their condition and prepare more valuable bouquets.

Add-ons
Add-ons are items which can increase the value of bouquets. Firstly a player has to choose add-ons and buy them in the shop. They appear on a board as a tile with a ribbon symbol. A player chooses one of the add-ons visible on the left side of the board and collects it by matching 3 or more ribbons in a line. Now it can be used to improve a bouquet and to get an extra tip.

Special Items
Buying special items allows players to improve the florist shop or to influence a client's mood and the environment.

See also
 Robot Rescue
 Ball Fighter
 1001 Crystal Mazes Collection
 Super Swap
 101 Shark Pets

References

External links
 Florist Shop's site at Teyon.com

2010 video games
Nintendo DS games
Nintendo DS-only games
Puzzle video games
Video games developed in Poland
Single-player video games
Floristry
Time management video games
Teyon games
UFO Interactive Games games